The meridian 164° east of Greenwich is a line of longitude that extends from the North Pole across the Arctic Ocean, Asia, the Pacific Ocean, the Southern Ocean, and Antarctica to the South Pole.

The 164th meridian east forms a great circle with the 16th meridian west.

From Pole to Pole
Starting at the North Pole and heading south to the South Pole, the 164th meridian east passes through:

{| class="wikitable plainrowheaders"
! scope="col" width="130" | Co-ordinates
! scope="col" | Country, territory or sea
! scope="col" | Notes
|-
| style="background:#b0e0e6;" | 
! scope="row" style="background:#b0e0e6;" | Arctic Ocean
| style="background:#b0e0e6;" |
|-
| style="background:#b0e0e6;" | 
! scope="row" style="background:#b0e0e6;" | East Siberian Sea
| style="background:#b0e0e6;" |
|-valign="top"
| 
! scope="row" | 
| Chukotka Autonomous Okrug Kamchatka Krai — from 
|-
| style="background:#b0e0e6;" | 
! scope="row" style="background:#b0e0e6;" | Sea of Okhotsk
| style="background:#b0e0e6;" | Penzhin Bay
|-
| 
! scope="row" | 
| Kamchatka Krai — Kamchatka Peninsula
|-
| style="background:#b0e0e6;" | 
! scope="row" style="background:#b0e0e6;" | Bering Sea
| style="background:#b0e0e6;" | Karaginsky Gulf
|-
| 
! scope="row" | 
| Kamchatka Krai — Karaginsky Island
|-
| style="background:#b0e0e6;" | 
! scope="row" style="background:#b0e0e6;" | Bering Sea
| style="background:#b0e0e6;" |
|-
| style="background:#b0e0e6;" | 
! scope="row" style="background:#b0e0e6;" | Pacific Ocean
| style="background:#b0e0e6;" |
|-
| style="background:#b0e0e6;" | 
! scope="row" style="background:#b0e0e6;" | Coral Sea
| style="background:#b0e0e6;" |
|-
| 
! scope="row" | 
|
|-
| style="background:#b0e0e6;" | 
! scope="row" style="background:#b0e0e6;" | Coral Sea
| style="background:#b0e0e6;" |
|-
| style="background:#b0e0e6;" | 
! scope="row" style="background:#b0e0e6;" | Pacific Ocean
| style="background:#b0e0e6;" |
|-
| style="background:#b0e0e6;" | 
! scope="row" style="background:#b0e0e6;" | Southern Ocean
| style="background:#b0e0e6;" |
|-
| 
! scope="row" | Antarctica
| Ross Dependency, claimed by 
|-
| style="background:#b0e0e6;" | 
! scope="row" style="background:#b0e0e6;" | Southern Ocean
| style="background:#b0e0e6;" | Ross Sea
|-
| 
! scope="row" | Antarctica
| Ross Dependency, claimed by 
|-
|}

See also
163rd meridian east
165th meridian east

e164 meridian east